The 2021 ITS Cup was a professional women's tennis tournament played on outdoor clay courts. It was the twelfth edition of the tournament which was part of the 2021 ITF Women's World Tennis Tour. It took place in Olomouc, Czech Republic between 19 and 25 July 2021.

Singles main-draw entrants

Seeds

 1 Rankings are as of 12 July 2021.

Other entrants
The following players received wildcards into the singles main draw:
  Nikola Bartůňková
  Sára Bejlek
  Nikola Břečková
  Anna Sisková

The following player received entry using a protected ranking:
  Anna Zaja

The following player received entry using a junior exempt:
  Diane Parry

The following players received entry from the qualifying draw:
  Miriam Bulgaru
  Bárbara Gatica
  Elizabeth Halbauer
  Monika Kilnarová
  Lena Papadakis
  Nika Radišić
  Sapfo Sakellaridi
  Julie Štruplová

Champions

Singles

 Sára Bejlek def.  Paula Ormaechea, 6–0, 6–0

Doubles

  Jessie Aney /  Anna Sisková def.  Bárbara Gatica /  Rebeca Pereira, 6–1, 6–0

References

External links
 2021 ITS Cup at ITFtennis.com
 Official website

2021 ITF Women's World Tennis Tour
2021 in Czech tennis
July 2021 sports events in the Czech Republic